John Lemondes Jr. is an American politician and businessman serving as a member of the New York State Assembly from the 126th district. Elected in November 2020, he assumed office on January 6, 2021.

Early life and education 
Lemondes is Greek-American. He earned a Bachelor of Science degree in agriculture from Pennsylvania State University, a Master of Business Administration from Syracuse University, and a Master of Arts in public administration from Maxwell School of Citizenship and Public Affairs.

Career 
Lemondes served in the United States Army for 27 years, retiring with the rank of colonel. During his tenure, Lemondes worked as a project manager for the United States Army Chemical Materials Activity and as a speechwriter. After retiring from the Army, Lemondes worked as a military and defense consultant for ASI Government and Saab AB. In 2014, Lemondes was a candidate for New York's 24th congressional district, placing second in the Republican primary after John Katko. Lemondes and his wife operate a family farm. He was elected to the New York State Assembly in November 2020 and assumed office on January 6, 2021.

References 

Living people
Pennsylvania State University alumni
Martin J. Whitman School of Management alumni
Maxwell School of Citizenship and Public Affairs alumni
American people of Greek descent
Republican Party members of the New York State Assembly
1965 births